Abu Bakr ibn Abi Salih was a Persian statesman, who served as the vizier of the Ghaznavid Sultan Farrukh-Zad (r. 1052-1059) from 1055 to 1059. When the latter's son Ibrahim of Ghazna ascended the throne, Abu Bakr was appointed as chief executive of the new ruler, while Abu Sahl Khujandi was appointed vizier. Abu Bakr was killed by a group of Turkic generals and palace guards in the early 1060s.

References

Sources 
C. E. Bosworth "Abu Bakr ibn Abi Salih." Encyclopedia Iranica. 28 January 2016. <http://www.iranicaonline.org/articles/abu-bakr-b-1>

1060s deaths
11th-century births
11th-century Iranian people
Ghaznavid viziers